Jill Collins McCorkle (July 7, 1958 Lumberton, North Carolina) is an American short story writer and novelist.

She graduated from University of North Carolina, in 1980, where she studied with Max Steele, Lee Smith, and Louis D. Rubin. She also attended Hollins College now Hollins University with Lee Smith where she received her MA. She taught at Tufts University, University of North Carolina, Duke University, Harvard University and Bennington College.
She teaches at North Carolina State University.

Awards
1993 New England Booksellers Award
2000 Dos Passos Prize
2018 Featured speaker at the Monroe Scholars Book and Authors luncheon.

Works

Stories available online
 "Going Away Shoes", Blackbird, Fall, 2007
 "Magic Words", Narrative, Fall 2008

Sources

References

External links
Author's website
"Creature of Habit: An Interview with Jill McCorkle", AGNI online, Sherry Ellis

20th-century American novelists
American women novelists
American women short story writers
1958 births
University of North Carolina at Chapel Hill alumni
Hollins University alumni
Tufts University faculty
University of North Carolina at Chapel Hill faculty
Duke University faculty
Harvard University faculty
Bennington College faculty
North Carolina State University faculty
Living people
20th-century American women writers
20th-century American short story writers
Writers of American Southern literature
Novelists from Massachusetts
Novelists from Vermont
American women academics
21st-century American women